Anna Christie is a 1923 American silent drama film based on the 1921 play by Eugene O'Neill (first film version) and starring Blanche Sweet and William Russell.

Directed by John Griffith Wray and produced by Thomas H. Ince for First National Pictures, the screenplay was adapted by Bradley King from the Eugene O'Neill play of the same title. Thomas H. Ince Inc. paid a then-astronomical $35,000 for the screen rights to the play.

Plot
As described in a film magazine review, Anna Christie, daughter of rugged coal barge captain Chris Christopherson, has not seen her father since she was a baby. During her life on a farm, she has been betrayed by one man and been the mistress of another. Her father, unaware of her past, is determined to protect her from the advances of sailor folk. She takes a voyage with him and falls in love with drunken Matt Burke. She admits her sins and is rescued from suicide by Chris. She is forgiven by Matt who still wishes to wed her.

Cast

Preservation
Prints of Anna Christie are located in the Museum of Modern Art in New York City, George Eastman Museum Motion Picture Collection, Gosfilmofond in Moscow, Cineteca Del Friuli in Genoma, Italy, and Harvard Film Archive.

See also
 Blanche Sweet filmography
 Anna Christie (1930)
 The Docks of New York (1928)

References

External links

 
 
 
 
 Lantern slide for Anna Christie (Wayback archived)

Silent American drama films
American silent feature films
American black-and-white films
1923 drama films
1923 films
Films about prostitution in the United States
American films based on plays
Films based on works by Eugene O'Neill
First National Pictures films
Films directed by John Griffith Wray
Seafaring films
1920s rediscovered films
Rediscovered American films
1920s American films
Silent adventure films